I'm Still Here may refer to:

 I'm Still Here (book), a 2018 memoir by Austin Channing Brown
In film and television:
 I'm Still Here: The Truth About Schizophrenia, a 1996 documentary film
 I'm Still Here (2010 film), a 2010 mockumentary directed by Casey Affleck
 "I'm Still Here" (Desperate Housewives), an episode of Desperate Housewives

In music:
 "I'm Still Here" (Juliana Kanyomozi song)
 I'm Still Here (album), a 2010 album by Mindy McCready
 "I'm Still Here" (Follies song), a song from Stephen Sondheim's musical Follies
 "I'm Still Here" (Vertical Horizon song)
 "I'm Still Here (Jim's Theme)," a 2002 song by John Rzeznik
 "I'm Still Here," a song by The Notations
 "I'm Still Here," the final, hidden track on the 1991 album Woodface by Crowded House
 "I'm Still Here," a song by Kula Shaker from Peasants, Pigs & Astronauts
 "I'm Still Here," a song by Tom Waits from Alice
 ""I'm Still Here" (Sia song)